Pepijn Aardewijn (born 15 June 1970 in Amsterdam, North Holland) is a former rower from the Netherlands, who competed for his native country in two consecutive Summer Olympics, starting in 1996. He won the silver medal in the men's lightweight double sculls event in Atlanta, Georgia, alongside Maarten van der Linden.

He is married and has a child with 2004 Olympic bronze medal and 2008 gold medal winner Kirsten van der Kolk.

References

Dutch Olympic Committee

1970 births
Living people
Dutch male rowers
Rowers at the 1996 Summer Olympics
Rowers at the 2000 Summer Olympics
Olympic rowers of the Netherlands
Olympic silver medalists for the Netherlands
Rowers from Amsterdam
Olympic medalists in rowing
Medalists at the 1996 Summer Olympics
20th-century Dutch people
21st-century Dutch people